Plumularia setacea, the plumed hydroid or little sea bristle, is a colonial hydrozoan in the family Plumulariidae and is found worldwide. It lives from the shore to 430m under water.

Description
Plumed hydroids are creamy yellow to brown  and have feathery stems. The stems may grow to 2 cm in total height. The reproductive bodies are smooth and oval.

Ecology
This species eats microplankton.

References

Plumulariidae
Fauna of South Africa
Animals described in 1758
Taxa named by Carl Linnaeus